DCD Media plc (formerly Digital Classics plc) is a UK and US based independent television production and distribution group headquartered in London and with offices in Los Angeles, London and Glasgow. The Group comprises a number of production companies working across all non fiction genres on both sides of the Atlantic, from primetime documentary, factual, factual entertainment and reality to drama documentary.

The production arm is supported by 2 international rights companies – DCD Rights and DCD Publishing. The Company floated on the London Stock Exchange's Alternative Investment Market in December 1999 and has since then developed through organic growth and acquisitions.

Group structure 
Productions companies:
 September Films
 Matchlight
 Prospect
 Rize USA

Distribution companies:
 DCD Rights (formerly known as NBD Television)
 DCD Publishing

Post production companies:
 Sequence Post

Milestones

References
"Timeweave takes stake in DCD", C21 Media, 12 April 2012

External links
 DCD Media
 September Films
 Matchlight
 Prospect Pictures
 Rize USA
 DCD Rights
 DCD Publishing
 Sequence Post

Television production companies of the United Kingdom